Abantis nigeriana, the Nigerian paradise skipper, is a butterfly in the family Hesperiidae. It is found in Senegal, the Gambia, Burkina Faso, Guinea, Ghana, Nigeria, southern Sudan and Gabon. The habitat consists of Guinea savanna.

Subspecies
Abantis nigeriana nigeriana (Senegal, Gambia, Burkina Faso, Guinea, Ghana to northern Nigeria)
Abantis nigeriana rougeoti Berger, 1959 (Gabon)

References

Butterflies described in 1901
Tagiadini